"One Morning in May" is a 1933 traditional popular song with lyrics by Mitchell Parish and music by Hoagy Carmichael.

Recordings 
 Hoagy Carmichael – recorded on October 10, 1933 for Victor
 Ray Noble with Al Bowlly – In London 1930–1934
 Bucky Pizzarelli – One Morning in May (2001)
 Frankie Randall – Swingin' Touch
 Dick Todd – recorded August 17, 1939 for Montgomery Ward Records
 Mel Tormé – Prelude to a Kiss (1958)

References

1933 songs
1930s jazz standards
Songs with lyrics by Mitchell Parish
Songs with music by Hoagy Carmichael